Kenya–Malaysia relations refers to bilateral foreign relations between Kenya and Malaysia. Kenya has maintained a resident Mission in Kuala Lumpur since in 1996. Malaysia opened a diplomatic Mission in Nairobi in 2005. Both countries are members of the Commonwealth of Nations.

History 

As early as 1964, Malaysia dispatched Lee Kuan Yew on a diplomatic mission to Kenya in a successful effort to boost relations. High level visits have continued into the 21st century. In 2007, the Malaysian prime minister at the time, Abdullah Ahmad Badawi, met with Kenya's President Mwai Kibaki. Two memoranda of understanding were signed at the meeting, setting out an agreement for Malaysia to assist Kenya with infrastructure projects including road building.

Economic relations 
Levels of trade between the two countries are only moderate, with Malaysia exporting more to Kenya than the African nation exports in return. In 2011, Kenyan Vice-President Kalonzo Musyoka stated that his country was keen learn from Malaysia about ICT and infrastructure development.

Trade
In 2014, bilateral trade was worth KES. 75.096 billion (US$742.5 million) RM. 3.143 billion.

Kenya exported goods worth KES. 556 million (US$5.5 million) RM. 23.7 million to Malaysia. Malaysia exported goods worth KES. 74.54 billion (US$737 million) RM 3.18 billion in the same year.

Kenya's main exports to Malaysia were: tea, textile articles, tobacco products, vegetables, fruits and nuts.

Malaysia's main exports to Kenya were:  palm oil, petroleum oils, furniture, articles of apparel and clothing accessories, telecommunications equipment, electronic and electrical goods, industrial machinery, steam boilers, and rubber tyres.

Travel 
On 26 November 2006, Port Klang Authority signed a sister-port agreement with Kenya Ports Authority.

See also
 Foreign relations of Kenya
 Foreign relations of Malaysia

References

External links 
 Malaysia and Kenya Strengthen Ties Joint Communiqué, 19 April 2007

 
Malaysia
Bilateral relations of Malaysia
Malaysia
Kenya